Park Jong-jin is a Korean name consisting of the family name Park and the given name Jong-jin. It may refer to:

 Park Jong-jin (footballer, born 1980)
 Park Jong-jin (footballer, born 1987)